The Grand Prix of Denver was a Champ Car race last held on a street circuit in Denver, Colorado, United States. A Champ Car race was first held in Denver in 1909 on a 14.5-mile (23.3-km) road circuit in nearby Brighton.  Racing returned to the Centennial Park dirt oval in 1951 and 1952 under AAA sanctioning. 38 years later Champ Cars returned to Denver with a CART-sanctioned event downtown near the Civic Center. However, like the previous incarnation, that race also lasted only two years. CART returned to Denver in 2002 with a race on a 1.64-mile (2.64-km) temporary circuit around the then-named Pepsi Center. The final race was held in 2006. Champ Car initially put the race on its 2007 schedule but removed it after conflicts with other events could not be reconciled.

Winners

AAA Championship Car results

CART/Champ Car World Series results

Lap Records
The fastest outright all-time track record set during a race weekend on the original layout is 1:25.896, set by Michael Andretti in a Lola T91/00, during qualifying for the 1991 Texaco/Havoline Grand Prix of Denver. The fastest outright all-time track record set during a race weekend on the second layout is 59.096 seconds, set by Sebastien Bourdais in a Lola B02/00, during qualifying for the 2006 Grand Prix of Denver. The fastest official race lap records at the Grand Prix of Denver are listed as:

References

 
Recurring sporting events established in 1990
Recurring sporting events disestablished in 2006
1990 establishments in Colorado
2006 disestablishments in Colorado